"When Dreams Turn to Dust" is a 1997 single by British dance-pop singer-songwriter Cathy Dennis. The song was the final single from her third album, Am I the Kinda Girl? (1996), and the last to be released by Dennis. The single was only released in the UK and reached No. 43 in June 1997. The accompanying music video featured a then unknown Vernon Kay.

Critical reception
British magazine Music Week rated the song four out of five, writing, "Following up Waterloo Sunset was never going to be easy, but Dennis pulls it off with this simple yet charming song penned with Guy Chambers."

Track listings
 UK CD 1 single
When Dreams Turn To Dust (Radio Edit) – 3:37
Fade Away (Non-LP B-Side) – 3:48
Roller Coaster (Non-LP B-Side) – 4:16
Falling (Re-recorded version with new vocals) – 3:59

 UK CD 2 single
When Dreams Turn To Dust (Radio Edit) – 3:37
Touch Me (All Night Long)
Just Another Dream
Too Many Walls

Weekly charts

References

1997 singles
Cathy Dennis songs
Songs written by Cathy Dennis
1997 songs
Polydor Records singles
Songs written by Guy Chambers
Songs about dreams